Bhujhangy Group are the world's longest-running bhangra band. The group was founded in Smethwick, near Birmingham, England, in 1967 by brothers Dalbir Singh Khanpur and Balbir Singh Khanpur, who had come to the United Kingdom to in the mid 1950s and been joined by their families in 1964, initially working as labourers in the West Midlands' factories. They were named Bhujhangy – meaning "kids" – as they were still teenagers, and their first recording was "Teri Chithi Noon Parthan", a 7" EP recorded in 1967 and distributed manually in pub juke boxes before being officially recorded and distributed in late 1969-70.

Bhujhangy appeared on television in 1969 as part of the celebrations of Sri Guru Nanak Dev Ji Maharaj 500th birthday - and the same year approached Oriental Star Agencies with a view to making further recordings. The group had always been interested in western music as well as traditional Punjabi music, learning to play the guitar, banjo and accordion as well as the dhol, tumbi and dholak. Their music gradually incorporated wider influences including modern western rhythms and sounds from Hindi-speaking Bollywood culture. Their early 1970 single "Bhabiye Akh Larr Gayee" was the first recording to combine traditional Asian sounds with modern western musical instruments and influences, a momentous step in the development of bhangra.

Bhujhangy received an award from the House of Commons of the United Kingdom for Punjabi cultural and Bhangra music in 2009 and a Lifetime Achievement Award from Brit Asia TV Music Awards in 2011.

Balbir Bhujhangy Appears in the Guinness Book of World Records for being the pioneer of Bhangra music in the UK since 1967 and continues to perform in 2021 and has released over 50 albums to date. 

Balbir was in the Guinness Book of World Records in 2019 and 2022 for the continuously singing for over 55 years.  

He started the band with his brother and a few friends that stayed together for 12 years until splitting in 1979. Over 350 musicians joined and left but Balbir Singh over the 55 years where some created their own Bhangra or dhol groups.  Balbir continued his work for further 45 years as Bhujhangy and still owns the name 'Bhujhangy' and 'Bhujhangy Group' under copyright laws 2023.  He still continues to perform on stage and release religious and Bhangra songs. The recent single is ‘Daddy Bina’ without Dad, which was a very emotional and touching songs, the video is available on YouTube.

Balbir Singh has recently released his autobiography book which is available via Amazon and other online retailers, it discusses his life journey from India to the UK and how he continued his passion during his difficult times in his life.

References

Bhangra (music) musical groups
Desi musicians
Musical groups from Birmingham, West Midlands
Musical groups established in 1967
1967 establishments in England